The discography of Neck Deep, a Welsh pop punk band, consists of four studio albums, one compilation album, three extended plays (EPs), eighteen singles and twenty-five music videos. Formed in Wrexham in 2012, Neck Deep originally featured lead vocalist Ben Barlow, lead guitarist Lloyd Roberts, rhythm guitarist Matt West, bassist Fil Thorpe-Evans and drummer Dani Washington. The band signed with independent record label We Are Triumphant in June 2012, before releasing their debut EP Rain in July in September that year. This was later followed by a second EP entitled A History of Bad Decisions, which was self-released by the band on 19 February 2013. Pinky Swear Records also issued the Rain in July and A History of Bad Decisions EPs together as a double 12" vinyl compilation on the same day.

After signing with Hopeless Records in August 2013, Neck Deep released their full-length debut album Wishful Thinking in January 2014. The album reached number 2 on the UK Rock & Metal Albums Chart, number 3 on the US Heatseekers Albums chart, and registered on several other UK and US charts. Hopeless also reissued the band's first two EPs, both separately and as a single set. In February, the group released a split EP with American band Knuckle Puck, and in June they released a cover version of Green Day's "Boulevard of Broken Dreams" for the Kerrang! free compilation Kerrang! Does Green Day's American Idiot. In 2015, the band contributed covers of Funeral for a Friend's "Juneau" and Blink-182's "Don't Tell Me It's Over" to compilations released by Rock Sound and Kerrang! magazines, respectively.

In August 2015, Neck Deep released their second studio album Life's Not out to Get You, which reached number 8 on the UK Albums Chart and number 17 on the US Billboard 200, as well as topping the UK Independent Albums and US Independent Albums charts. Days after the album's release, Roberts left the band when accusations of "misconduct with underage girls" were levelled at the guitarist (as well as other members of the group). He was later replaced by Sam Bowden, who was previously a member of Blood Youth.

Albums

Studio albums

Compilation albums

Extended plays

Singles

Music videos

Other appearances

See also
 List of songs recorded by Neck Deep

References

External links
Neck Deep official website
Neck Deep discography at AllMusic
Neck Deep discography at Discogs
Neck Deep discography at MusicBrainz

Discographies of British artists
Pop punk group discographies